Bedlam is a 1996 run and gun video game developed by Mirage and published by GT Interactive for DOS, Windows, Mac OS, and PlayStation.

Gameplay
Bedlam is a game in which players use a squad of three huge remote assault tanks (RATs) against mutated monsters called Biomex.

Reception
Next Generation reviewed the PC version of the game, rating it three stars out of five, and stated that "actual gameplay becomes tiresome after a while – shoot the monsters, look for the end of the level, go to the next level, shoot some more monsters. However, in small doses, it's fun enough for long enough to be worth giving it a shot."

Reviews
Computer Games Magazine – 1996
Pelit – September 1996
GameSpot – October 31, 1996
PC Games – November 1996
PC Gamer – January 1997
NowGamer – July 1, 1997
PC Zone – August 13, 2001

References

1996 video games
Cancelled Sega Saturn games
Classic Mac OS games
DOS games
GT Interactive games
Mirage Technologies (Multimedia) Ltd. games
PlayStation (console) games
Real-time tactics video games
Run and gun games
Video games developed in the United Kingdom
Windows games